In mathematics, modular units are certain units of rings of integers of fields of modular functions, introduced by .  They are functions whose zeroes and poles are confined to the cusps (images of infinity).

See also

Cyclotomic unit
Elliptic unit

References

Modular forms